Tekelspor is a defunct basketball club based in İstanbul, Turkey that played in the Turkish Basketball League.  Their home arena is the Haldun Alagaş Sports Hall. The club was sponsored by Tekel Company.

External links
TBLStat.net Profile

Basketball teams in Turkey
Defunct basketball teams in Turkey
Basketball teams established in 1941